The following outline is provided as an overview of and topical guide to Romania:

Romania – unitary semi-presidential republic located in Central-Southeastern Europe, bordering the Black Sea to the south-east, between Bulgaria and Ukraine. It also borders Hungary to the west, Serbia to the south-west, and the Republic of Moldova to the east. It covers 238,391 square kilometres (92,043 sq mi) and has a predominantly temperate continental climate. 

With  19 million inhabitants (as of early 2022), it is the seventh most populous member state of the European Union (EU). Its capital and largest city, Bucharest, is the fourth largest city in the EU. It encompasses the historical regions of Wallachia (including Dobruja), Moldavia (including Bukovina), Transylvania (including Banat, Maramureș, and Crișana). Romania  derives from the Latin romanus, meaning "citizen of Rome".

General reference 

 Pronunciation:
 Common English country name:  Romania
 Official English country name:  Romania
 Common endonym(s): România
 Official endonym(s): Român
 Adjectival(s): Romanian 
 Demonym(s): Romanian
 Etymology: Name of Romania
 ISO country codes:  RO, ROU, 642
 ISO region codes:  See ISO 3166-2:RO
 Internet country code top-level domain:  .ro

Geography of Romania 

Geography of Romania
 Romania is: a country
 Location:
 Northern Hemisphere and Eastern Hemisphere
 Eurasia
 Europe
 Central Europe
 Eastern Europe
 Time zone:  Eastern European Time (UTC+02), Eastern European Summer Time (UTC+03)
 Extreme points of Romania
 High:  Moldoveanu 
 Low:  Black Sea 0 m
 Land boundaries:  2,508 km
 608 km
 531 km
 476 km
 450 km
 443 km
 Coastline:  Black Sea 225 km
 Population of Romania: 19,638,000 (2017) – 58st most populous country
 Area of Romania: 238,391 km2
 Atlas of Romania

Environment of Romania 

 Climate of Romania
 Environmental issues in Romania
 Renewable energy in Romania
 Geology of Romania
 Protected areas of Romania
 Wildlife of Romania
 Flora of Romania
 Fauna of Romania
 Birds of Romania
 Mammals of Romania

Geographic features of Romania 

 Glaciers of Romania
 Islands of Romania
 Lakes of Romania
 Mountains of Romania
 Rivers of Romania
 World Heritage Sites in Romania

Regions of Romania

Administrative divisions of Romania 
Administrative divisions of Romania
 Regions of Romania
 Counties of Romania
 Municipalities of Romania

Regions of Romania 

Development regions of Romania
These are the 8 development regions in Romania, which (with the exception of București-Ilfov) are named by their geographical position in the country:
 Macroregiunea 1:
 Nord-Vest (6 counties)
 Centru (6 counties)
Macroregiunea 2:
 Nord-Est (6 counties)
 Sud-Est (6 counties)
Macroregiunea 3:
 Sud-Muntenia (7 counties)
 București-Ilfov (1 county and Bucharest)
Macroregiunea 4:
 Sud-Vest Oltenia (5 counties)
 Vest (4 counties)

Counties of Romania 
Counties of Romania
{{center|

Municipalities of Romania 
Municipalities of Romania
 Capital of Romania: Bucharest
 Cities of Romania

Demography of Romania 
Demographics of Romania

Neighbours of Romania 
 Ukraine
 Moldavia
 Bulgaria
 Serbia
 Hungary

Government and politics of Romania 

 Form of government: unitary semi-presidential representative democratic republic
 Capital of Romania: Bucharest
 Elections in Romania
 Political parties in Romania
 Corruption scandals in Romania

Branches of the government of Romania 
Government of Romania

Executive branch of the government of Romania 
 Head of state: President of Romania, Klaus Iohannis
 Presidents of Romania
 Head of government: Prime Minister of Romania, Ludovic Orban
Prime ministers of Romania
 Cabinet of Romania

Legislative branch of the government of Romania 
 Parliament of Romania – bicameral, composed of two equal houses:
 The Chamber of Deputies of Romania
 The Senate of Romania

Judicial branch of the government of Romania 
Court system of Romania
 Supreme Court of Romania

Foreign relations of Romania 
Foreign relations of Romania
 Diplomatic missions in Romania
 Diplomatic missions of Romania

International organization membership 
Romania is a member of:

 Australia Group
 Bank for International Settlements (BIS)
 Black Sea Economic Cooperation Zone (BSEC)
 Central European Initiative (CEI)
 Confederation of European Paper Industries (CEPI)
 Council of Europe (CE)
 Euro-Atlantic Partnership Council (EAPC)
 European Bank for Reconstruction and Development (EBRD)
 European Investment Bank (EIB)
 European Space Agency (ESA)
 European Union (EU)
 Food and Agriculture Organization (FAO)
 Group of 9 (G9)
 International Atomic Energy Agency (IAEA)
 International Bank for Reconstruction and Development (IBRD)
 International Chamber of Commerce (ICC)
 International Civil Aviation Organization (ICAO)
 International Criminal Court (ICCt)
 International Criminal Police Organization (Interpol)
 International Development Association (IDA)
 International Federation of Red Cross and Red Crescent Societies (IFRCS)
 International Finance Corporation (IFC)
 International Fund for Agricultural Development (IFAD)
 International Hydrographic Organization (IHO)
 International Labour Organization (ILO)
 International Maritime Organization (IMO)
 International Mobile Satellite Organization (IMSO)
 International Monetary Fund (IMF)
 International Olympic Committee (IOC)
 International Organization for Migration (IOM)
 International Organization for Standardization (ISO)
 International Red Cross and Red Crescent Movement (ICRM)
 International Telecommunication Union (ITU)
 International Telecommunications Satellite Organization (ITSO)
 International Trade Union Confederation (ITUC)

 Inter-Parliamentary Union (IPU)
 Latin American Integration Association (LAIA) (observer)
 Multilateral Investment Guarantee Agency (MIGA)
 Nonaligned Movement (NAM) (guest)
 North Atlantic Treaty Organization (NATO)
 Nuclear Suppliers Group (NSG)
Organisation internationale de la Francophonie (OIF)
 Organization for Security and Cooperation in Europe (OSCE)
 Organisation for the Prohibition of Chemical Weapons (OPCW)
 Organization of American States (OAS) (observer)
 Permanent Court of Arbitration (PCA)
 Southeast European Cooperative Initiative (SECI)
 United Nations (UN)
 United Nations Conference on Trade and Development (UNCTAD)
 United Nations Educational, Scientific, and Cultural Organization (UNESCO)
 United Nations High Commissioner for Refugees (UNHCR)
 United Nations Industrial Development Organization (UNIDO)
 United Nations Mission in Liberia (UNMIL)
 United Nations Mission in the Sudan (UNMIS)
 United Nations Observer Mission in Georgia (UNOMIG)
 United Nations Operation in Cote d'Ivoire (UNOCI)
 United Nations Organization Mission in the Democratic Republic of the Congo (MONUC)
Uniunea Latină
 Universal Postal Union (UPU)
 Western European Union (WEU) (associate partner)
 World Confederation of Labour (WCL)
 World Customs Organization (WCO)
 World Federation of Trade Unions (WFTU)
 World Health Organization (WHO)
 World Intellectual Property Organization (WIPO)
 World Meteorological Organization (WMO)
 World Tourism Organization (UNWTO)
 World Trade Organization (WTO)
 Zangger Committee (ZC)

Law and order in Romania 
Law of Romania
 Capital punishment in Romania
 Constitution of Romania
 Crime in Romania
 Human rights in Romania
 LGBT rights in Romania
 Freedom of religion in Romania
 Law enforcement in Romania

Military of Romania 
Military of Romania
 Command
 Commander-in-chief: President of Romania
 Ministry of Defence of Romania
 Forces
 Army of Romania
 Navy of Romania
 Air Force of Romania
 Special forces of Romania
 Military history of Romania
 Military ranks of Romania

Local government in Romania 
Local government in Romania

History of Romania 
History of Romania

History of Romania, by period 
 Timeline of Romanian history
 Prehistoric Romania
 Dacia
 Roman Dacia
 Romania in the Middle Ages
 Early Modern Romania
 United Principalities
 Kingdom of Romania
 Kings of Romania
 Romanian Campaign (World War I)
 Greater Romania
 Romania during World War II
 Socialist Republic of Romania
 Romanian Revolution
 History of Romania since 1989
 Current events of Romania

History of Romania, by region 
 Bessarabia
 Dobruja
 Moldavia
 Wallachia
 List of rulers of Wallachia
 Transylvania

History of Romania, by subject 
 History of the Jews in Romania
 Military history of Romania
 Romanian Armed Forces ranks and insignia
 Romanian mythology

Culture of Romania 
Culture of Romania
 Romanian Academy
 Architecture of Romania
 Cuisine of Romania
 Customs of Romania
 Romanian Christmas customs
 Ethnic minorities in Romania
 Festivals in Romania
 Folklore of Romania
 Holidays in Romania
 Humor in Romania
 Media in Romania
 Mythology of Romania
 National symbols of Romania
 Coat of arms of Romania
 Flag of Romania
 National anthem of Romania
 People of Romania
 Philosophy of Romania
 Prostitution in Romania
 Public holidays in Romania
 Records of Romania
 World Heritage Sites in Romania

Art in Romania 
Art in Romania
 Architecture of Romania
 Cinema of Romania
 Dance in Romania
 Literature of Romania
 Music of Romania
 Romanian rock music
 National anthem of Romania
 Television in Romania
 Theatre in Romania

Languages of Romania 
Languages of Romania
 Romanian language
 Moldovan language
 Istro-Romanian language
 Megleno-Romanian language
 Aromanian language
 Hungarian language

People of Romania 
Common Romanian surnames
Eastern name order used in Romanian personal names

Romanians 
Romanians
 List of Romanians
 List of Romanian writers
 List of Romanian poets
 List of Romanian monarchs
 List of famous Romanians

Romanian diaspora 
Romanian diaspora
 Romanian American
 List of Romanian Americans
 Romanian Canadian
 Romanian French
 Romanians of Australia
 Romanians in Bulgaria
 Romanians of Serbia

Religion in Romania 
Religion in Romania
 Christianity in Romania
 Baptist Union of Romania
 Convention of the Hungarian Baptist Churches of Romania
 Romanian Orthodox Church
 Hinduism in Romania
 Islam in Romania
 Judaism in Romania

Sports in Romania 
Sports in Romania
 Football in Romania
 Romania at the Olympics

Economy and infrastructure of Romania 
Economy of Romania
 Economic rank, by nominal GDP (2007): 42nd (forty-second)
 Agriculture in Romania
 Banking in Romania
 National Bank of Romania
 Communications in Romania
 Internet in Romania
 Romanian-language television stations
 Radio stations in Romania
 Companies of Romania
 Supermarkets in Romania
 Antena 1
 Billa
 Angst
 La Fourmi
 Vodafone Romania
 Orange Romania
 Romanian Television
 List of newspapers in Romania
 Automobile Dacia
 Currency of Romania: Leu
 ISO 4217: RON
 Energy in Romania
 Energy policy of Romania
 Oil industry in Romania
 Mining in Romania
 Tourism in Romania
 Bucharest Stock Exchange
 Sibiu Stock Exchange
 Health care in Romania
 Transport in Romania
 Airports in Romania
 Rail transport in Romania
 Roads in Romania
 Water supply and sanitation in Romania

Education in Romania 
Education in Romania
 List of universities in Romania

See also 

Romania
 List of international rankings
 List of Romania-related topics
 Member state of the European Union
 Member state of the North Atlantic Treaty Organization
 Member state of the United Nations
 Outline of Europe
 Outline of geography

(place the links from the following sections into the outline above)
 Geography
 Protected areas
 Topography

 Politics
 Administrative divisions
 Constitution
 Elections
 Foreign relations
 Government
 Human rights
 LGBT
 LGBT history
 Judiciary
 Law enforcement
 Military
 Parliament
 Political parties
 Unification with Moldova

 Economy
 Agriculture
 Energy
 Foreign investment
 Foreign trade
 Industry
 automotive
 construction
 mining
 petrochemical
 Leu 
 National Bank
 Property bubble
 Science and technology
 Services
 Stock Exchange
 Telecommunications

 Society
 Crime in Romania
 Immigration to Romania
 Languages in Romania
 Minorities of Romania
 Hungarians in Romania
 Public holidays in Romania
 Social structure of Romania
 Systematization (Romania)
 Social welfare in Romania

References

External links 

 Overviews
 BBC News Country Profile – Romania
 CIA World Factbook – Romania
 US Department of State – Romania
 Federal Research Division, Library of Congress -Romania : a country study

 Economy and law links
 Exchange Rates – from the National Bank of Romania
 Romanian Law and Miscellaneous – English

 Culture and history links
 Chronology of Romania from the World History Database
 ICI.ro – A comprehensive site about Romania
 Treasures of the national library of Romania

Outlines of countries
 1
 Romania-related lists